The scarlet skimmer or ruddy marsh skimmer, Crocothemis servilia, is a species of dragonfly of the family Libellulidae, native to east and southeast Asia and introduced to Jamaica, Florida, and Hawaii.

Subspecies
There are two known subspecies; Crocothemis servilia servilia (Drury, 1773) and Crocothemis servilia mariannae Kiauta, 1983. C. s. mariannae lacks the mid-dorsal black stripe.

Description and habitat
It is a medium sized blood-red dragonfly with a thin black line along the mid-dorsal abdomen. Its eyes are blood-red above, purple laterally. Thorax is bright ferruginous, often blood-red on dorsum. Abdomen is blood-red, with a narrow black mid-dorsal carina. Anal appendages are blood-red. Female is similar to the male; but with olivaceous-brown thorax and abdomen. The black mid-dorsal carina is rather broad.  

It breeds in ponds, ditches, marshes, open swamps and rice fields.

See also 
 List of odonates of Sri Lanka
 List of odonates of India
 List of odonata of Kerala

References

External links
 
 Chen et al (2009) Common edible insects and their utilization in China. Entomological Research 39:299-303
 Ying et al (2001) Three edible odonata species and their nutritive value. Forest Research 14:421-424
 Scarlet skimmer at USGS
 Insects as food in China Chen et al (2009)
 Nutritive value Ying et al (2001)

Libellulidae
Insects described in 1773